Forever Will Be Gone is the third and final studio album released by the gothic metal band Mortal Love on 22 September 2006.

Background 
Forever Will Be Gone concludes the trilogy of releases started by the albums All the Beauty... and I Have Lost....

The album features the new keyboardist Mulciber (Ole Kristian Odden), including shortly before the recording sessions.

Track listing
All tracks composed by Mortal Love.

Personnel

Mortal Love 
 Cat (Catherine Nyland) – Female vocals
 Lev  (Hans Olav Kjeljebakken) – Bass, vocals
 Rain6 (Lars Bæk) – Guitars & Programming, vocals
 Damous (Pål Wasa Johansen) – Drums
 Mulciber (Ole Kristian Odden) – Keyboards & Programming

Session musicians
 Zet (Henning Ramseth)  – Additional Guitar and vocals in "I Make the Mistake"

Additional notes
Engineer – Kenneth Skårholen, Zet 
Layout [Cover Layout], Design – Katja Piolka
Mixed By, Mastered By – Andy Horn 
Photography By –www.everainmedia.com
Producer – Lev, Rain6
Phonographic Copyright  – Mystic Empire
Manufactured By – Мистик Импайр
Licensed From – Massacre Records
Recorded At – Space Valley Studio
Mixed At – The Red Room
Mastered At – The Red Room

References

External links 
Discogs.com
Metallum Archives

2006 albums
Massacre Records albums
Mortal Love albums